I liga, currently named Fortuna I liga due to its sponsorship by Fortuna, is the men's second professional association football division of the Polish football league system, below the Ekstraklasa and above the II liga via promotion/relegation systems. Run by the Polish Football Association (PZPN) since its inception on 30 May 1948. The league was renamed from Second League (II liga) to First League (I liga) in 2008. It is currently contested by 18 teams, from 2002 all clubs onwards must have a licence, issued by the Association.

Before 1939, there were several plans to create a second, national level of Polish football system, but all failed. Instead, there were regional leagues of most Polish provinces, the so-called A Classes (see also Lower Level Football Leagues in Interwar Poland).

History

State Class in Austrian Galicia
In 1913 and 1914, the football championship of Austrian Galicia took place. At that time it was called the A Class Championship, with four top teams of the province (Cracovia, Wisła Kraków, Pogoń Lwów and Czarni Lwów). Since there were many more football teams in Galicia, the B Class Championship was made for them. Also, in 1921, already in the Second Polish Republic, there were two levels: winners of regional A Classes played in the national championship, while winners of the B Classes (Cracovia II, Pogoń Lwów II, AZS Warszawa and Union Łódź) had their own tournament. For financial reasons, this idea was abandoned after one year.

Second Polish Republic
In the Second Polish Republic, there were regional leagues, or A Classes, which were the second level of Polish football system, behind the Ekstraklasa, which was formed in 1927, see Lower Level Football Leagues in Interwar Poland. Since in the late 1930s only two teams were promoted to the Ekstraklasa, and there were as many as fourteen regional champions, there was a complicated system of playoffs. Firstly, winners of neighbouring A Classes played each other, and in the final stage, four teams competed, with two top sides winning the promotion.

Formation
Second-level league was first created for the 1949 season, and was split into northern and southern sections, each comprising 10 teams. First plans to create this league appeared in 1947. On February 14 and 15, 1948, a meeting of officials of Polish Football Association took place in Warsaw. Officials from Gdańsk promoted the creation of the league, but this idea was opposed by the delegates from the most powerful regions of Polish football: Kraków, Łódź, Upper Silesia and Warsaw. On May 30, 1948, however, the second division was officially approved, with 18 teams in one group. On February 19, 1949, Polish Football Association decided to expand the league to 20 teams, divided into northern and southern groups.

First games of the new, second division, took place on March 20, 1949, with the first goal scored by Jozef Kokot of Naprzód Lipiny, in a game between Naprzód and Błękitni Kielce. First winners of the second division were Garbarnia Kraków (northern group) and Górnik Radlin (southern group): both sides were promoted to the Ekstraklasa. To determine a winner of the 1949 season of the second division, Górnik had to play Garbarnia in three extra games (4:2, 0:2 and 4:3). The top scorer of the first season was Mieczyslaw Nowak of Garbarnia, with 24 goals. Relegated were the teams of Ognisko Siedlce and PTC Pabianice (northern group), and Błękitni Kielce and Pafawag Wrocław (southern group).

1950s
For the 1951 season the format was changed to four groups, with eight teams in each group.

1970s–2008
For the 1973–74 season the 2nd level was changed to comprise two sections, split into north and south.

For the 1989–90 season the league reverted to a single group.

In 2000 the number of teams was limited to 20 sides, then to 18. Champions and vice-champions received automatic promotion, while third place teams competed in playoffs. The bottom four teams were relegated.

New name
From the 2008–09 season, the league was renamed as I liga. The number of teams competing remained at 18. Teams which place 15-18 were automatically relegated to II liga (West or East). The first and second placed teams were promoted to the Ekstraklasa. In 2014 II liga merged into one group and these rules were changed – the three worst-ranked teams are relegated, and the 15th I liga club compete in playoffs with the fourth placed II liga team.
In 2018 the relegation playoff was removed. Since the 2019–20 season the top 2 teams are automatically promoted whilst teams placed 3–6 compete in a playoff for the final 3rd spot.

Clubs

Stadiums and locations

''Note: Table lists in alphabetical order.

 Due to the renovation of the Resovia Stadium in Rzeszów, Resovia will play their home games at Stadion Stal in Rzeszów. Originally they declared to play home matches at the Podkarpackie Centrum Piłki Nożnej in Stalowa Wola.
 ŁKS played its home games in a partially-completed stadium until the April 22 match against Chrobry Głogów, when the remainder of the stadium was officially opened for use. 
 In the first half of the 2021/2022 season Skra played every home match on the opponent's stadium, as the home team, because Municipal Football Stadium Loretańska in Częstochowa didn't meet the license requirements of the I liga. From April 16, 2022, they play their home games at a substitute stadium GIEKSA Arena. Originally they declared to play home matches at the Stadion Ludowy in Sosnowiec.

Champions of the Polish second level

1949: Górnik Radlin, Garbarnia Kraków
1950: Gwardia Szczecin, Ogniwo Bytom
1951: Budowlani Gdańsk, OWKS Kraków
1952: Gwardia Warsaw, Budowlani Opole
1953: Gwardia Bydgoszcz
1954: Stal Sosnowiec
1955: Budowlani Opole
1956: Polonia Bytom
1957: Polonia Bydgoszcz, Cracovia
1958: Pogoń Szczecin, Górnik Radlin
1959: Odra Opole, Stal Sosnowiec
1960: Lech Poznań, Stal Mielec
1961: Gwardia Warsaw
1962: Stal Rzeszów, Pogoń Szczecin
1962–63: Szombierki Bytom
1963–64: Śląsk Wrocław
1964–65: Wisła Kraków
1965–66: Cracovia
1966–67: Gwardia Warsaw
1967–68: Zagłębie Wałbrzych
1968–69: Gwardia Warsaw
1969–70: ROW Rybnik
1970–71: Odra Opole
1971–72: ROW Rybnik
1972–73: Szombierki Bytom
1973–74: Arka Gdynia, GKS Tychy
1974–75: Widzew Łódź, Stal Rzeszów

1975–76: Arka Gdynia, Odra Opole
1976–77: Zawisza Bydgoszcz, Polonia Bytom
1977–78: Gwardia Warsaw, GKS Katowice
1978–79: Zawisza Bydgoszcz, Górnik Zabrze
1979–80: Bałtyk Gdynia, Motor Lublin
1980–81: Pogoń Szczecin, Gwardia Warsaw
1981–82: GKS Katowice, Cracovia
1982–83: Górnik Wałbrzych, Motor Lublin
1983–84: Lechia Gdańsk, Radomiak Radom
1984–85: Zagłębie Lubin, Stal Mielec
1985–86: Olimpia Poznań, Polonia Bytom
1986–87: Szombierki Bytom, Jagiellonia Białystok
1987–88: Ruch Chorzów, Stal Mielec
1988–89: Zagłębie Lubin, Zagłębie Sosnowiec
1989–90: Hutnik Kraków
1990–91: Stal Stalowa Wola
1991–92: Pogoń Szczecin, Siarka Tarnobrzeg
1992–93: Warta Poznań, Polonia Warszawa
1993–94: Raków Częstochowa, Stomil Olsztyn
1994–95: Śląsk Wrocław, GKS Bełchatów
1995–96: Odra Wodzisław, Polonia Warszawa
1996–97: Dyskobolia Grodzisk Wlkp., Petrochemia Płock
1997–98: Ruch Radzionków, GKS Bełchatów
1998–99: Dyskobolia Grodzisk Wlkp., Petrochemia Płock
1999–00: Śląsk Wrocław
2000–01: RKS Radomsko

2001–02: Lech Poznań
2002–03: Górnik Polkowice
2003–04: Pogoń Szczecin
2004–05: Korona Kielce
2005–06: Widzew Łódź
2006–07: Ruch Chorzów
2007–08: Lechia Gdańsk
2008–09: Widzew Łódź
2009–10: Widzew Łódź
2010–11: ŁKS Łódź
2011–12: Piast Gliwice
2012–13: Zawisza Bydgoszcz
2013–14: GKS Bełchatów
2014–15: Zagłębie Lubin
2015–16: Arka Gdynia
2016–17: Sandecja Nowy Sącz
2017–18: Miedź Legnica
2018–19: Raków Częstochowa
2019–20: Stal Mielec
2020–21: Radomiak Radom
2021–22: Miedź Legnica

See also
 Lower Level Football Leagues in Interwar Poland

References

External links
 Official website 
 PSN Futbol – I liga table, results and news 

 
2
Poland
Professional sports leagues in Poland